Terrell Brown Jr. (born April 23, 1998) is an American professional basketball player for the Memphis Hustle of the NBA G League. He played college basketball for the Shoreline CC Dolphins, Seattle Redhawks, Arizona Wildcats, and Washington Huskies.

High school career
Brown played basketball for Garfield High School in Seattle, Washington, where he won two state championships. He had a limited role during his high school career, playing alongside Jaylen Nowell and Tramaine Isabell. Brown was lightly recruited and only received offers from NCAA Division II programs.

College career
Brown first attended Western Oregon University but returned home after one month after struggling to adjust to living in a small college town. He attended Green River College for the rest of the year before joining the team at Shoreline Community College, where his cousin served as assistant coach. As a freshman, Brown averaged 30 points per game, leading the Northwest Athletic Conference in scoring and steals. He received Freshman of the Year and All-Defensive Team honors.

For his sophomore season, Brown joined NCAA Division I program Seattle as a walk-on. He earned a scholarship in the second semester of his first year. As a sophomore, Brown averaged 14.1 points, 6.8 rebounds and 4.5 assists per game, earning Second Team All-Western Athletic Conference (WAC) and All-Newcomer Team honors. In his junior season, he averaged a conference-leading 20.8 points, 6.2 rebounds and 4.8 assists per game, and was named to the First Team All-WAC. For his senior season, Brown transferred to Arizona. As a senior, he averaged 7.3 points, 3.5 rebounds and 3.5 assists per game. Brown opted to use an additional year of eligibility, granted due to the COVID-19 pandemic, and transfer to Washington. On November 23, 2021, he scored a career-high 32 points in an 87–76 win against South Dakota State. Brown was named first-team All-Pac-12.

Professional career
After going undrafted in the 2022 NBA draft, Brown joined the Minnesota Timberwolves for Summer League. On October 22, 2022, Brown was selected by the College Park Skyhawks in the 2022 NBA G League draft with the 7th overall pick. However, he was waived 6 days later. On November 17, he signed with the Memphis Hustle.

Career statistics

College

NCAA Division I

|-
| style="text-align:left;"| 2018–19
| style="text-align:left;"| Seattle
| 33 || 28 || 33.4 || .455 || .318 || .682 || 6.8 || 4.5 || 1.1 || .3 || 14.1
|-
| style="text-align:left;"| 2019–20
| style="text-align:left;"| Seattle
| 29 || 29 || 36.0 || .415 || .291 || .784 || 6.2 || 4.8 || 1.6 || .4 || 20.8
|-
| style="text-align:left;"| 2020–21
| style="text-align:left;"| Arizona
| 26 || 10 || 25.7 || .390 || .368 || .776 || 3.5 || 3.5 || .9 || .2 || 7.3
|-
| style="text-align:left;"| 2021–22
| style="text-align:left;"| Washington
| 32 || 32 || 36.1 || .452 || .200 || .772 || 4.2 || 4.3 || 2.2 || .5 || 21.7
|- class="sortbottom"
| style="text-align:center;" colspan="2"| Career
| 120 || 99 || 33.1 || .434 || .284 || .756 || 5.2 || 4.3 || 1.5 || .4 || 16.3

JUCO

|-
| style="text-align:left;"| 2017–18
| style="text-align:left;"| Shoreline CC
| 25 || 25 || 34.6 || .437 || .347 || .746 || 8.0 || 4.0 || 3.2 || .3 || 30.0

Personal life
Brown is the godson of Jason Terry, who played in the NBA before becoming a coach. Terry served as his assistant coach at Arizona.

References

External links
Washington Huskies bio
Arizona Wildcats bio
Seattle Redhawks bio

1998 births
Living people
American men's basketball players
Basketball players from Seattle
Arizona Wildcats men's basketball players
Seattle Redhawks men's basketball players
Washington Huskies men's basketball players
Shoreline Dolphins men's basketball players
Garfield High School (Seattle) alumni
Western Oregon University alumni
Green River College alumni
Point guards
Shooting guards